José Roberto López Londoño (29 June 1937 – 21 September 2018) was a Colombian Roman Catholic bishop.

López Londoño was born in Colombia and was ordained to the priesthood in 1962. He served as the  titular bishop of Urbisaglia and as the auxiliary bishop of the Roman Catholic Archdiocese of Medellin, Colombia, from 1982 to 1987. He then served as bishop of the Roman Catholic Diocese of Armenia from 1987 to 2003 and finally served as bishop of the Roman Catholic Diocese of Jericó from 2003 to 2013.

Notes

1937 births
2018 deaths
20th-century Roman Catholic bishops in Colombia
21st-century Roman Catholic bishops in Colombia
Roman Catholic bishops of Medellín